Ten Ten were an American new wave band formed in Richmond, Virginia in 1984. The band was composed of guitarist/vocalist Mark Lewis, bassist Peter Bell, keyboardist Don Ruzek and drummer Lee Johnson.  They are best remembered for their 1986 hit "When it Rains" and their cover of the Plimsouls hit "A Million Miles Away". They disbanded in 1988.

History 
Ten Ten's debut album, Ordinary Thinking was released in 1984, on independent record label Generic Records. It was produced by the band, and engineered by Bruce Olson. Ordinary Thinking offered "diabolically good melodic rock from a Virginia quartet with a British accent. The memorable tunes are energetically played with attractive, intricate vocals and arrangements that smoothly blend guitars and synthesizers in almost equal doses." Similar favorable reviews helped Ten Ten snag their major label contract.

The band were mostly compared to British bands by the American press, which is why they chose to sign with a UK label, Chrysalis, and concentrated a good deal of their live energy in England and the rest of Europe. In autumn 1985 they toured with The Waterboys, and in 1986, they toured with Simply Red and later Pete Shelley.

Ten Ten spent the early part of 1986 in a recording studio in the Netherlands making their debut LP with producer Stephen Street. The resulting titled Walk On was released on April 28, 1986. Two singles "When it Rains" and a cover of the new wave hit "A Million Miles Away", were released. Both were available in 7- and 12-inch single formats, and featured non-album B-sides "The Secret Life of Madeline". and "Peace and Love". The music video for "When it Rains" appeared on MTV in the spring of 1986.

Ten Ten disbanded in 1988.

Discography

Albums

Singles

References

American new wave musical groups
Musical groups established in 1984
Musical groups disestablished in 1988